Cicarelli is an Italian surname. Notable people with the surname include:

Daniella Cicarelli (born 1978), Brazilian TV show hostess and fashion model
Fernando Chacarelli (1905–1984), Argentinean runner who competed as Fernando Cicarelli

See also
Ciccarelli

Italian-language surnames